Blanes Hoquei Club Fundació was a professional roller hockey team based in Blanes, Catalonia. Its major successes to date are winning the 2001 Copa del Rey and reaching the final of the 2010 CERS Cup, lost to Liceo La Coruña.

History
Blanes HCF held since 2004 the international roller hockey tournament named Golden Cup, that has won twice (2006 and 2007).

The club was dissolved in 2015.

Season to season

Trophies
Copa del Rey: 1
2001
Golden Cup: 2
2006, 2007

References

External links
Blanes HC Official Website

1961 establishments in Catalonia
2015 disestablishments in Catalonia
Catalan rink hockey clubs
Sports clubs established in 1961
Sports clubs disestablished in 2015